Profit & Loss: In the Currency & Derivative Markets is a monthly business magazine founded by Julie Ros in July 1999 specializing in coverage of foreign exchange and derivative markets. Julie Ros was also the founding editor-in-chief.

Each month, Profit & Loss looks at the changes taking place in the industry - the strategic shifts into new markets and products and the technological advances that are changing the way the FX and derivatives markets function.

The magazine's publisher is P&L Services Ltd, a privately held publishing company based in London.

References

External links
 

Business magazines published in the United Kingdom
Magazines established in 1999
Magazines published in London
Monthly magazines published in the United Kingdom
1999 establishments in the United Kingdom